Pony Time are an American two-piece garage rock band from Seattle, Washington, consisting of two members: Luke Beetham on bass/baritone guitar/vocals and Stacy Peck on drums. The band has been praised by such as CMJ and Spin.

History
The two met helping a mutual friend move a stereo back in 2009, and started playing their unique brand of danceable punk music together soon after – eventually leading to several nationwide tours and three albums. Frontman Luke Beetham (also a guitarist in the British garage band Armitage Shanks) is locally renowned for his keen fashion sense, having been featured in the weekly Seattle newspaper the Stranger'''s "Men In Rock" guide. Drummer Stacy Peck (also a member in the alternative-rock band Childbirth) has also brought some notoriety to the group by directing most of the band's music videos, which have been featured in prominent publications such as Spin and Vice. Peck is also an out lesbian who has written about her experiences for Vice.

Pony Time has shared the stage with notable groups such as Rocket From The Crypt, Jenn Ghetto, Tacocat and The Thermals. Most recently, the band plans on releasing a new album, and were featured on episode 209 of the local television show, Band in Seattle.

DiscographyPony Time Can Drink 100 Wine Coolers (Dont Stop Believin' Records, 2010)Pony Time (Per Se Records, 2011)Go Find Your Own'' (Per Se Records, 2013)

References

Garage rock groups from Washington (state)
Musical groups from Seattle
Musical groups established in 2009